The Shrine of Our Lady of Grace, also known as Sanctuary of Montenero, is a religious complex on the Monte Nero Livorno Hills, in Livorno, central Italy reachable by a funicular. 

The complex, elevated to the rank of Basilica and maintained by Vallumbrosan monks, is devoted to Our Lady of Grace of Montenero, patron of Tuscany. It also  includes a rich gallery of votive offerings.

History
To commemorate a legend, a small Chapel was built at the beginning of the road that leads to the shrine dating back to 1603. In 1956 it was replaced  by a larger church. 
 
The Theatine monks  enlarged the sanctuary. Between the end of the 16th century and early 17th century an oval atrium was added and richly decorated. 
After the suppression of religious orders by Grand Duke Peter Leopold, the sanctuary fell into ruin. It was later restored.

Grottos
The presence of caves dug into the hill behind the shrine is attested since ancient times and probably have also been a refuge for robbers. 
In the early  20th century, they were extended as a result of an excavation company, which obtained permission for the extraction of the stone material. 
Having hosted shelters during World War II, it had been fully consolidated in 1971 and then open to visitors of the shrine.
Due to land fall the Grotto has been closed to the public for quite a few years now.

Sources
G. Batini, Toscana fuoristrada, Bonechi Editore, Florence 1971.
G. Piombanti, Guida storica ed artistica della città e dei dintorni di Livorno, Livorno 1903.

External links

Official website
Artistic information Madonna delle Grazie di Montenero
Tourism at the Religious Sanctuary of Montenero

Monasteries in Tuscany
Votive offering
Basilica churches in Tuscany
Buildings and structures in Livorno